The Rieucros Camp  was an internment camp on a forested hillside near Mende in the French department of Lozère that operated from January 1939 to February 1942. Prime Minister Édouard Daladier established the camp by decree on January 21, 1939, to isolate members of the International Brigades from French society after the defeat of the Second Spanish Republic and subsequent exile, known as la Retirada, in the Spanish Civil War. Other "suspicious and undesirable foreign men," sometimes accused of common law crimes, were also interned. After France's entry into World War II, authorities transferred the men to the camp of le Vernet and began to intern "suspicious and undesirable foreign women" in October 1939. Following the Battle of France, Rieucros fell in the southern unoccupied zone and the Vichy regime assumed control of the camp from Third Republican authorities. In February 1942, authorities transferred the entire camp population of women and children to the camp of Brens.

Background

In the late 1930s, the French Third Republic increasingly restricted immigration as increasing numbers of political refugees fled ascendant European dictatorships. Prime Minister Édouard Daladier of the Radical Party circumvented Parliament to issue a series of decree laws that closed avenues of legal immigration and punished illegal immigration in 1938 and 1939, reversing the nation's tradition of being a country of asylum. Daladier's decree of November 12, 1938 gave the state the power to intern foreigners in camps.

As the Spanish Civil War came to a close in the first months of 1939, the armies of soon to be dictator Francisco Franco drove nearly 500,000 refugees north across the border with France. The French Third Republic responded by creating a series of internment camps to house and confine the refugees, the first of which was Rieucros. Historians cite French fears of social revolution and civil war, xenophobia, and the notion that foreign antifascists fleeing Franco, Mussolini, and Hitler wanted to draw France into another European war "to satisfy their personal lust for revenge" as motivating factors for France's hostile reception of refugees during this time. As a result, the majority of the interned populations in France on the eve of World War II were the first victims and opponents of European fascism, allowing for a near seamless takeover by the collaborationist Vichy regime when the Third Republic fell to Nazi Germany in June 1940.

Internees
The following people were interned in the camp of Rieucros:
Italian antifascist Ernesto Bonomini was interned and escaped the camp in April 1939
Russian anarchist writer Ida Mett and her son
German Communist resister Dora Schaul
Journalist Hanka Grothendieck and her son, mathematician Alexandre Grothendieck
Spanish Republican Isabel del Castillo and her son, writer Michel del Castillo
Writer and journalist Lenka Reinerová
French Communist resister Angelita Bettini
Teresa Noce, Italian labor leader, activist and journalist

Memorial Association
L'Association pour le souvenir de Rieucros is a memorial association established on August 12, 1992, with the goal  "to preserve the memory of the suffering of the camp's internees but also to study the causes leading to the creation of such a camp in the recent past." Members of the Association include former internees and their surviving family members, among others. The association engages in educational and commemorative activities, including preserving the site of the camp, creating informative historical plaques, and participating in an annual commemorative ceremony on July 16, the National Day of Remembrance for Victims of Racist and Antisemitic Persecution on the anniversary of the Vel' d'Hiv Roundup.

Few traces remain of the camp. The barracks and barbed wire have disappeared. The most significant vestige of the camp today is a carved rock that depicts a soldier with a gun and the dates 1789 and 1939, marking the 150th anniversary of the French Revolution. A nearby rock bears the inscription "Gierke, Walter," a former internee of the camp who may have sculpted the memorial.

Further reading

Literature and Memoirs
Michel del Castillo, Tanguy (1957)
Isabel del Castillo, El Incendio: Ideas y Recuerdos (1954)
Vera T. Mirsky, The Cup of Astonishment (1944)
Lenka Reinerova, Promenade au lac des cygnes (2004, French translation)
Dora Schaul, Résistance - Erinnerungen deutscher Antifaschisten (1973)

Non-Fiction
Mechtild Gilzmer, Fraueninternierungslager in Südfrankreich : Rieucros und Brens 1939-1944 (1994 original in German), and Camps de femmes. Chroniques d'internées Rieucros et Brens (1939-1944) (2000 translation by Nicole Bary to French)
Sandrine Peyrac, Le camp d'internement de Rieucros, 1939-1942 : l'internement, de la République à l'état français (2008)
Denis Peschanski, La France des camps: l'internement 1938-1946 (2002)

References

World War II internment camps in France
Buildings and structures in Lozère
Vichy France
Internment camps of the Spanish Civil War
1939 establishments in France